The Stuckism International Gallery was the gallery of the Stuckist art movement. It was open from 2002 to 2005 in Shoreditch, and was run by Charles Thomson, the co-founder of Stuckism. It was launched by a procession carrying a coffin marked "The death of conceptual art" to the neighbouring White Cube gallery.

The gallery staged group and solo shows of Stuckist paintings, and displayed a preserved shark as a challenge to Damien Hirst and Charles Saatchi. The premises were taken over by La Viande gallery, which shut in 2008.

History
Charles Thomson had originally intended to buy a Shoreditch warehouse building with his then-wife, Stella Vine, but, after the arrangements had been made, she withdrew from the project. He subsequently made the purchase on his own.

Thomson lived on the premises, using the ground floor and basement for a studio. He said:
The space was designed to fulfill the belief stated in our manifesto that the best space for art is not a white wall gallery but the more human space of a home (or a musty museum). The main space was my living room. It had sofas and normal home lighting, not gallery spotlights, which create a separation between the art and the viewer. People could come in, sit down, maybe have a cup of tea and experience the art as part of their environment, if they wanted to. The upstairs walls were either brick or painted maroon, and the downstairs a deep green. It was a small oasis in the greyness of the outside environment...

Stephen Howarth was a member of the Students for Stuckism group at Camberwell College of Arts and in 2002 was "expelled from the painting course for doing paintings." He was given a show, before the official opening of the gallery, with the title I Don't Want a Painting Degree if it Means Not Painting. 

To celebrate the opening of the gallery, the Stuckists carried a cardboard coffin round to the nearby White Cube gallery to announce "The Death of Conceptual Art". 

This event also launched the first formal group show at the gallery which was The First Stuckist International. The show had Stuckist art from around the world including Melbourne, Pittsburgh and the Ivory Coast. It ran till October 2002, reinforcing the Stuckist manifesto endorsement of content, meaning and communication through painting as the most viable contemporary form of art.

David Prudames of 24 Hour Museum reviewed the show, "This exhibition of Stuckist work from around the world at a purpose built gallery lays the movement's foundations and states it is here to stay." Arty magazine edited by Cathy Lomax of Transition Gallery said, "Work presented here is always a wonder to behold... The best painted space in town—the coloured walls are themselves better than some galleries' shows... Art with attitude, whatever style you happen to enjoy. And there are more styles here than you'd be led to believe." However, Sarah Kent stated in Time Out, "it will prove their undoing. These vociferous opportunists are revealed to be a bunch of Bayswater Road-style daubers without an original idea between them."

In October 2002 the Gallery displayed a betting slip by Sean Hall. This was a bet that "Charles Saatchi, the renowned contemporary art collector, will purchase the original of this betting slip for pounds 1,000 or more on or before 31 December 2005."

In December 2002 the gallery staged The Real Turner Prize Show to protest that the Tate's Turner Prize should be for paintings. The four artists shown at the gallery—Ella Guru, Mandy McCartin, Paul Harvey and Charles Williams—shared the Stuckist prize. 

On 17 April 2003, when the Saatchi Gallery opened in new premises at County Hall with a display of Damien Hirst's work, including The Physical Impossibility of Death in the Mind of Someone Living (a shark in formaldehyde in a vitrine), the Stuckism gallery displayed a stuffed shark in their window. This 148 kg (325 lb) golden hammerhead shark had been caught off Florida in 1989, two years before Hirst's work was made, by Eddie Saunders, who displayed it in his Shoreditch shop, JD Electrical Supplies.
 Thomson asked:
If Hirst’s shark is recognised as great art, then how come Eddie’s, which was on exhibition for two years beforehand, isn’t? "Do we perhaps have here an undiscovered artist of genius, who got there first, or is it that a dead shark isn’t art at all? Not only did Eddie catch it himself — unlike Hirst — but it is also in considerably better condition.

We can’t see why Hirst’s shark was made so much fuss of when Eddie’s has been in a public London venue all this time. A lot of people admired it in his shop, but I doubt that anyone considered it a work of artistic genius.
The Stuckists suggested Hirst may got the idea for his work from Saunders' shop display.

In September 2003, the gallery collaborated with the Prince of Wales in hosting a charity show and auction with paintings including ones by Judi Dench, Jerry Hall and, said Thomson, "a painting from the BritArt artist Gavin Turk, who is normally somebody we would attack." The next month, the gallery's scheduled show, The Real Turner Prize Show, was cancelled because of a dispute with Gina Bold, one of the artists, over how it should be promoted.

In February 2004, the gallery exterior was turned into a 1960s and 1970s sex shop frontage as a set for the BBC2 gangster drama, The Long Firm (based on the book by Jake Arnott).

In May 2004, Mounsi was presented with the inaugural 3AM Good Sex Prize at the gallery for his book, The Demented Dance, after an event which included readings by Tony White and Colin MacCabe. Later that month, Charles Saatchi and his wife, Nigella Lawson arrived in a black cab to visit the gallery, but failed to gain admission, as Thomson was upstairs drinking coffee and Saatchi did not ring the bell.

The last exhibition at the Gallery, in July 2004, was a solo show, Hysterical Shock, consisting of 12 paintings by Gina Bold from private collections   and named after the title of one of them. It was curated by Louise Urwin and Tom Cowley. Bold was invited to participate in the show, but did not reply or attend it.

La Viande

Thomson moved in 2005 and the premises were taken over by La Viande gallery, which staged a Stuckist exhibition in September 2005, called "Painting Is the Medium of Yesterday"—Paul Myners CBE, Chairman of Tate Gallery, Chairman of Marks and Spencer, Chairman of Aspen Insurance, Chairman of Guardian Media, Director of Bank of England, Director of Bank of New York. A Show of Paintings by the Stuckists, as Refused by the Tate Gallery. Guaranteed 100% Free of Elephant Dung.

A large photo was displayed in the gallery window of Paul Myners, who had made the remark, "Painting is the medium of yesterday", to the Stuckists during their demonstration in 2004 against the Turner Prize at Tate Britain. He had also told them that their popular show, The Stuckists Punk Victorian at the Walker Art Gallery in Liverpool, was "a travesty".
 
In February 2008, La Viande staged Disney Heroines Committing Suicide, a show of two Stuckist artists, Abby Jackson and Mark D, the latter's work satirising Stella Vine's paintings. La Viande closed in July 2008.

List of shows

Group Shows
The First Stuckist International
War on Blair
The Real Turner Prize Show 2002
Stuckist Classics..
Stuckist Classics 2
Stuckist Classics 3
The Stuckist Summer Show 2003
Kith and Kids charity show included work by Ella Guru, Paul Harvey, Charles Thomson (artist), Jane Kelly, Gina Bold, Adrian Bannister, Jerry Hall, Elizabeth Jagger, Judi Dench, Richard Rogers, Gavin Turk, Keith Coventry and Jon Moss
Cabinet of Conceptualism featured a brick by Mike Dawson and a Saatchi betting slip by Sean Hall.
The Real Turner Prize Show 2003 (cancelled)

Solo shows
A Dead Shark Isn't Art, Eddie Saunders
Intellectual Property, photos by Larry Dunstan
The Vagina Monologues Of An Essex Boy, David Beesley
Portraits of Leigh Bowery by Sexton Ming
The Pinhole Photography of a Gifted Gentleman Amateur, Wolf Howard
Being On The Dole Is Like Playing Chess with Hitler, Wolf Howard
Hysterical Shock, Gina Bold

Other
3:AM Magazine Good Sex Prize, presented by Madame Tytania (with whip)

Gallery

References

External links

 Stuckism International Gallery Archive
 Stuckism International Online Gallery
 Intellectual Property photography show by Larry Dunstan at Stuckism International
 The Long Firm on the BBC web site

Defunct art galleries in London
Former buildings and structures in the London Borough of Hackney
Contemporary art galleries in London
2002 establishments in England
2005 disestablishments in England
Stuckism
Art galleries established in 2002
Art galleries disestablished in 2005